Shad Kalayeh (also Romanized as Shād Kalāyeh; also known as Shāh Kalāyeh) is a village in Daryasar Rural District, Kumeleh District, Langarud County, Gilan Province, Iran. At the 2006 census, its population was 1,976, in 564 families.

References 

Populated places in Langarud County